Barbara Taylor may refer to:
Barbara Taylor (historian) (born c. 1950), Canadian-born historian in the United Kingdom
Barbara Ann Hackmann Taylor (1943–1967), homicide victim
Barbara Austin Taylor (1891–1951), British sculptor
Barbara Nevins Taylor, American investigative journalist and journalism professor
Barbara Brown Taylor (born 1951), American Episcopal priest, professor and theologian

See also
Barbara Taylor Bradford (born 1933), British-American novelist